Chediski Peak is a mountain located in Navajo County, AZ. It has an elevation of 7,462 feet. 

Chediski Peak is known for being the location and namesake of the Rodeo-Chediski fires.

References

Mountains of Navajo County, Arizona